The 21st Annual Gotham Independent Film Awards, presented by the Independent Filmmaker Project, were held on November 28, 2011. The nominees were announced on October 20, 2011. The ceremony was hosted by Edie Falco and Oliver Platt.

Winners and nominees
{| class="wikitable" role="presentation"
| style="vertical-align:top; width:50%;"| 
 Beginners (TIE) The Tree of Life (TIE) The Descendants
 Meek's Cutoff
 Take Shelter
| style="vertical-align:top; width:50%;"| 
 Better This World
 Bill Cunningham New York
 Hell and Back Again
 The Interrupters
 The Woodmans
|-
| style="vertical-align:top; width:50%;"| 
 Dee Rees – Pariah
 Mike Cahill – Another Earth
 Sean Durkin – Martha Marcy May Marlene
 Vera Farmiga – Higher Ground
 Evan Glodell – Bellflower
| style="vertical-align:top; width:50%;"| 
 Felicity Jones – Like Crazy as Anna Gardner
 Elizabeth Olsen – Martha Marcy May Marlene as Martha/Marcy May/"Marlene Lewis"
 Harmony Santana – Gun Hill Road as Vanessa
 Shailene Woodley – The Descendants as Alexandra "Alex" King
 Jacob Wysocki – Terri as Terri Thompson
|-
| style="vertical-align:top; width:50%;"| 
 Girlfriend
 Being Elmo: A Puppeteer's Journey
 Buck
 The First Grader
 Wild Horse, Wild Ride
| style="vertical-align:top; width:50%;"|
 Scenes of a Crime
 Codependent Lesbian Space Alien Seeks Same
 Green
 The Redemption of General Butt Naked
 Without
|-
| colspan="2" style="vertical-align:top;"| 
 Beginners – Keegan Boos, Mary Page Keller, Mélanie Laurent, Kai Lennox, Ewan McGregor, Christopher Plummer, and Goran Višnjić The Descendants – Mary Birdsong, Beau Bridges, George Clooney, Robert Forster, Judy Greer, Rob Huebel, Nick Krause, Matthew Lillard, Amara Miller, and Shailene Woodley
 Margin Call – Penn Badgley, Simon Baker, Paul Bettany, Jeremy Irons, Aasif Mandvi, Mary McDonnell, Demi Moore, Zachary Quinto, Kevin Spacey, and Stanley Tucci
 Martha Marcy May Marlene – Christopher Abbott, Brady Corbet, Hugh Dancy, Maria Dizzia, Julia Garner, John Hawkes, Louisa Krause, Elizabeth Olsen, and Sarah Paulson
 Take Shelter – Kathy Baker, Jessica Chastain, LisaGay Hamilton, Robert Longstreet, Ray McKinnon, Katy Mixon, Michael Shannon, Tova Stewart, and Shea Whigham
|}

Special awards
Spotlight on Women Filmmakers "Live the Dream" Grant
  Lucy Mulloy – Una Noche
 Jenny Deller – Future Weather
 Rola Nashef – Detroit Unleaded

Gotham Tributes
 David Cronenberg
 Gary Oldman
 Tom Rothman
 Charlize Theron

References

External links
 

2011 film awards
2011